Helena Whitbread  (born 1931) is an English writer from Halifax, West Yorkshire. She is best known for the decryption and editing of the 19th-century Halifax lesbian landowner Anne Lister's secret coded diaries.  She discovered the Lister diaries in the 1980s and spent five years decoding and transcribing the diaries working on 50 pages each weekend.  She is the first researcher to publish the coded passages of the diaries of Anne Lister.  The diaries consisted of 27 books, over six thousand pages and over four million words.  The Anne Lister diaries that were decoded by Whitbread have won the recognition of The United Nations as a ‘pivotal’ document in British history and in 2011 they were added to the Memory of the World Register. The list is compiled by the UN Cultural Organization UNESCO and the archives are available online as historical UK documents.

During the years Whitbread spent researching Anne Lister's journals, she was employed at private religious school.  Once her manuscript was accepted for publication she bravely advised the school Director that she would be publishing a book about Lister that would contain graphic content regarding Lesbian sexuality. Such was her conviction of the critical sociological relevance of this work that she was prepared for any reaction. Instead Monsignor recognized the importance and impact the biography of this woman could have for long term social justice for women and the LGBT community. He advised Whitbread “you have lit a fuse (for social change).” He was correct.

Lister's lifestory is currently an 8 part series, Season One joint production by HBO and BBC. Based on Whitbread's research, (including researchers Anne Choma and Jill Liddington) conceived, written, directed by Sally Wainwright and starring actress Suranne Jones “Gentleman Jack” has become a global hit. It has been renewed for a second season. Tourist traffic to Lister's Shibden Hall Estate, Halifax England has increased nearly 10,000 people in August 2019.

Her book The Secret Diaries of Miss Anne Lister was the inspiration for the song played at the end of the Gentleman Jack HBO BBC television series. The song was written by Golcar artists O'Hooley and Tidow.

Whitbread was appointed Member of the Order of the British Empire (MBE) in the 2023 New Year Honours for services to history and literature.

References 

Living people
1931 births
20th-century English writers
20th-century British women writers
People from Halifax, West Yorkshire
English historians
Members of the Order of the British Empire